Westwick Lakes is a  biological Site of Special Scientific Interest south of North Walsham in Norfolk.

Many wildfowl over-winter on these five man-made lakes, which have unusual aquatic flora. Plants on the lake margins include lesser reedmace, soft rush and sweet flag.

The site is private with no public access.

References

Sites of Special Scientific Interest in Norfolk